Steeve Gaston Epesse-Titi (born 5 July 1979) is a French former professional footballer who played as a defender. He played in the Football League for Exeter City during the 2000–01 season.

Club career
Epesse-Titi began his career at hometown club Bordeaux, but failed to make a first team appearance for their main team. Instead, he played numerous games for Bordeaux B in the French lower leagues before being released in 2000.

The defender moved to England to sign for First Division club Wolverhampton Wanderers after a successful trial. However, he was never to make a first team appearance for Wolves; instead being an unused substitute three times. After eight months at Molineux, he departed to Third Division Exeter City on a free transfer.

He made his Football League debut on 31 March 2001 when he appeared for Exeter in a 2–0 win against Blackpool. This was the first of six appearances for the Grecians during his short-term contract that expired at the end of the campaign.

After having had unsuccessful trials at Kidderminster and Clyde, he returned to France and played out his career with L'Île-Rousse Monticello and Stade Bordelais before retiring in 2008.

Notes

External links

1979 births
Living people
French footballers
French expatriate footballers
English Football League players
FC Girondins de Bordeaux players
Wolverhampton Wanderers F.C. players
Exeter City F.C. players
Expatriate footballers in England
Stade Bordelais (football) players
Association football defenders